Michael Blouin may refer to:

 Mike Blouin (born 1945), American politician
 Michael Blouin (writer), Canadian writer